Aïn Azel District is a district of Sétif Province, Algeria.

Communes 
The District is composed of four communes: Aïn Azel, Aïn Lahdjar, Bir Hadada and Beida Bordj.

Districts of Sétif Province